Captain Oliver Gardiner House is a historic house prominently located in Warwick, Rhode Island.  Built about 1750, it is a -story wood-frame structure with a gambrel roof.  Its main facade has six irregularly-spaced bays, with a centrally positioned entrance.  The house is unusual for its period in that it has a large central hallway, a feature not commonly seen until the Federal period.  Oliver Gardiner, its first owner, was a ship's captain.

The house was listed on the National Register of Historic Places in 1983.

See also
National Register of Historic Places listings in Kent County, Rhode Island

References

Houses completed in 1750
Houses on the National Register of Historic Places in Rhode Island
Houses in Warwick, Rhode Island
National Register of Historic Places in Kent County, Rhode Island